Aramac Airport  is an unlicensed airport located  from the town of Aramac in remote Central Queensland. The airport is used by suppliers bringing goods into the town and is also used by the locals to fly to major towns or cities in their own planes or by booking a private plane.

If required planes from nearby Longreach or Muttaburra can be booked to land and pick up any passengers.

See also
 List of airports in Queensland

References

Airports in Queensland
Aramac